María Silvina D'Elía (born 25 April 1986) is an Argentine field hockey player. At the 2012 Summer Olympics, she competed for the Argentina national field hockey team. Silvina won the 2010 World Cup, five Champions Trophy, the silver medal at the 2012 Summer Olympics in London and two Pan American Cups.

D'Elía was called up in May 2017 by Agustín Corradini to come back to Las Leonas. She first accepted to join but two weeks later she declined the offer. Then she was called up by Carlos Retegui to take part in the 2019 team.

References

External links
 
 

1986 births
Living people
Argentine female field hockey players
Olympic field hockey players of Argentina
Field hockey players at the 2012 Summer Olympics
Olympic medalists in field hockey
Las Leonas players
Olympic silver medalists for Argentina
Argentine people of Italian descent
Medalists at the 2012 Summer Olympics
Sportspeople from Mendoza, Argentina
Pan American Games silver medalists for Argentina
Pan American Games medalists in field hockey
South American Games gold medalists for Argentina
South American Games medalists in field hockey
Field hockey players at the 2011 Pan American Games
Competitors at the 2006 South American Games
Pan American Games gold medalists for Argentina
Field hockey players at the 2019 Pan American Games
Medalists at the 2011 Pan American Games
Medalists at the 2019 Pan American Games